Adam Rudolph (born September 12, 1955) is a jazz composer and percussionist performing in the post-bop and world fusion media.

In 1988, Rudolph met jazz musician Yusef Lateef, and the two would go on to collaborate and perform together for the next 25 years.

Rudolph has released several albums as leader and has also recorded with musicians Sam Rivers, Omar Sosa, Wadada Leo Smith, Pharoah Sanders, Bill Laswell, Herbie Hancock, Foday Musa Suso, and Shadowfax.

Discography

As leader 
 Adam Rudolph's Moving Pictures (Flying Fish, 1992)
 Skyway (Soul Note, 1994)
 Contemplations (Meta, 1997)
 12 Arrows (Meta, 1999)
 Go: Organic Orchestra: 1 (Meta, 2002)
 Web of Light (Meta, 2002)
 Dream Garden (Justin Time, 2008)
 Yeyi (Meta, 2010)
 Both/And (Meta, 2011)
 Merely a Traveler On the Cosmic Path (Meta, 2012)
 Glare of the Tiger (Meta, 2017)

As co-leader 
With Build an Ark
 Peace with Every Step (Kindred Spirits, 2004)
 Dawn (Kindred Spirits, 2007)

With Eternal Wind
 Eternal Wind (Flying Fish, 1984)
 Terra Incognita (Flying Fish, 1987)
 Wasalu (Flying Fish, 1988)

With Hu Vibrational
 Boonghee Music 1 (Eastern Developments, 2002)
 Beautiful Boonghee Music 2 (Soul Jazz, 2004)
 Universal Mother Boonghee Music 3 (Soul Jazz, 2006)
 The Epic Botanical Beat Suite Boonghee Music 4 (Meta, 2015)

With Yusef Lateef
 Live in Seattle (YAL, 1999)

With Mandingo Griot Society
 Mandingo Griot Society (Flying Fish, 1978)
 Mighty Rhythm (Flying Fish, 1981)

With Bennie Maupin
 Symphonic Tone Poem for Brother Yusef (Strut, 2022)

With Universal Quartet
 The Universal Quartet (Blackout Music, 2009)
 Light (ILK Music, 2013)

As sideman 

With Jon Hassell
 City: Works of Fiction (Opal, 1990)
 Dressing for Pleasure (Warner Bros., 1994)
 Seeing Through Sound (Ndeya, 2020)

With Bill Laswell
 Kauai: The Arch of Heaven (Metastation, 2014)
 Against Empire (M.O.D. Reloaded, 2020)

Dave Liebman
 The Unknowable (RareNoise, 2018)
 Chi (RareNoise, 2019)

With Yusef Lateef
 Tenors of Yusef Lateef and Archie Shepp (YAL, 1992)
 The African-American Epic Suite for Quintet and Orchestra (ACT, 1994) – recorded in 1993
 The World at Peace (Meta, 1997)[2CD] – recorded in 1995
 Beyond the Sky (YAL/Meta, 2000)
 A G.I.F.T. (YAL, 2000)
 Live at Luckman Theater (YAL, 2001)
 Towards the Unknown (Meta, 2010) – recorded in 2009
 Voice Prints (Meta, 2013) – recorded in 2008

With Shadowfax
 Shadowdance (Windham Hill, 1983)
 The Dreams of Children (Windham Hill, 1984)
 Too Far to Whisper (Windham Hill, 1986)

With Wadada Leo Smith
 Compassion (Meta, 2006) – recorded in 2002
 Najwa (TUM TUM, 2017) – recorded in 2014

With others
 Fred Anderson, The Missing Link (Nessa, 1984) – recorded in 1979
 Bob Belden, Puccini's Turandot (Blue Note, 1993)
 Joseph Bowie, Good Medicine (Defunkt Music, 2013) – recorded in 2011
 Henry Brant, The Henry Brant Collection Vol. 2 (Innova, 2004)
 Norman Connors, Passion (Capitol, 1988)
 Hamid Drake, Karuna (Meta, 2018)
 Hassan Hakmoun, Gift of the Gnawa (Flying Fish, 1991)
 Herbie Hancock, Jazz Africa (NEC Avenue, 1987)
 Hue and Cry, Remote (Circa, 1988)
 Sam Rivers, Vista (Meta, 2004)
 Ned Rothenberg, Overlays (Moers Music, 1991)
 Pharoah Sanders, Spirits (Meta, 2000)
 Claudia Schmidt, Claudia Schmidt (Flying Fish, 1979)
 Paul Shapiro, Shofarot Verses (Tzadik, 2014) – recorded in 2013
 Avery Sharpe, Extended Family II Thoughts of My Ancestors (JKNM, 1995) – recorded in 1994
 Antonio Pinho Vargas, Selos E Borboletas (EMI, 1991)

References

External links
 Adam Rudolph at Meta Records
 Radio interview with Adam Rudolph

1955 births
Living people
American jazz percussionists
American world music musicians
Justin Time Records artists
Flying Fish Records artists
RareNoiseRecords artists